Big Brother 6 nominations table may refer to:
 Big Brother Australia 2006 nominations table
 Big Brother 2005 nominations table (UK)